Paul Schmidt (born 9 August 1931) is a German middle-distance runner. He competed in the 800 metres at the 1956 Summer Olympics and the 1960 Summer Olympics.

References

1931 births
Living people
Athletes (track and field) at the 1956 Summer Olympics
Athletes (track and field) at the 1960 Summer Olympics
German male middle-distance runners
Olympic athletes of the United Team of Germany
Place of birth missing (living people)